The 2012–13 Professional Hockey League season was the 21st annual edition of the Ukrainian Hockey Championship, and the second season of the Professional Hockey League (PHL). Seven teams participated in season, with HC Donbass-2 becoming national champions for second year in a row.

Regular season 

Points are awarded as follows:
 3 Points for a win in regulation ("W")
 2 Points for a win in overtime ("OTW") or a penalty shootout ("SOW")
 1 Point for a loss in overtime ("OTL") or a penalty shootout ("SOL")
 0 Points for a loss in regulation ("L")

Group stage

Group A

Group B 

 Berkut, the winners of the regular championship, were disqualified for not fulfilling their financial obligations to the PHL. Bilyi Bars took their place

Playoffs

Bracket

Semifinals 
HC Dynamo Kharkiv – HC Donbass-2 0-3 (3:4 OT, 1:6, 0:3)
HC Kompanion-Naftogaz – Sokil Kyiv 3-2 (2:0, 3:4 SO, 4:2, 2:3, 2:1 SO)

3rd place 
Sokil Kyiv – HC Dynamo Kharkiv 3:2

Final 
HC Kompanion-Naftogaz – HC Donbass-2 0-4 (2:4, 0:3, 0:5, 2:3 SO)

Player statistics

Top scorers
The following players lead the league by points at the end of the regular season

Leading goaltenders
The following goaltenders led the league by save percentage at the end of the regular season

References

Ukra
Professional Hockey League seasons
Prof